Christian Lundahl (born 18 February 1972) is a Swedish professor of education at Örebro University. Lundahl is specialized in the assessment for learning, evaluation and of Swedish educational research. Lundahl has worked as a consultant to the National agency of education and the National agency for school inspection on several occasions.

References 

1972 births
Swedish educational theorists
Living people
Uppsala University alumni
Academic staff of Örebro University
Place of birth missing (living people)